This is a list of banks in Liechtenstein.

Name - official website - SWIFT Bank Identifier Code

Major 
 LGT Bank –  – BLFLLI2
 Liechtensteinische Landesbank –  – LILALI2
 VP Bank AG –  – VPBVLI2

Other active 
Bank Alpinum –  – SWIFT: N/A
Bank Frick & Co. –  – BFRILI22
Banque Havilland –  – SFBALI22
BENDURA BANK AG –  – HYIBLI22
EFG Bank von Ernst AG –  – EFGBLI22
Kaiser Partner Privatbank –  – SERBLI22
Mason Privatbank Liechtenstein –  – RAIBLI22XXX
Neue Bank –  – NBANLI22
SIGMA Bank AG –  – VOAGLI22XXX
SIGMA KREDITBANK AG – 
Union Bank –  – UNIVLI22

Defunct 
 Alpe Adria Privatbank AG (in Liquidation)
 Bank Vontobel
 Centrum Bank

Statistics, information and anti-money laundering principles are available at Liechtenstein Bankers' Association  and the Financial Market Authority (Liechtenstein). 

 
Liechtenstein
Banks
Liechtenstein